City of Refuge is a Christian organization that provides food and shelter for those in need created in July 1997.

The City of Refuge was founded in July 1997 by Bruce Deel, the senior pastor of The Mission Church. Deel is a graduate of the Lee university of Cleveland. He has received numerous awards and for his success with the City of Refuge. He is a highly sought-out speaker and consults for numerous Non-profit organizations.

The City of Refuge provides a housing program Eden Village. This organization also provides vocational training including the : Workforce Innovation Hub which offers mentoring and training on job readiness, NAPA Auto Center which is a 15 week long auto tech training and job placement, 180° Kitchen Culinary Arts Academy which is a 10 week long for careers in the restaurant and hospitality industry and Veterans Molding Minds where military veterans are giving one on one mentoring and coaching to help insure them long time employment. This organization as well provides youth development which include : Feed My Lambs a child  care program for children residing in Eden Village, Kid City an elementary school designed to enrich students with academics, discipline and emotional behaviors and Bright Futures Academy a partner of the organization that provides middle school and high school education for 100 students.
This organization is also partnered with Saint Joseph's Mercy Care Services which provides health care for residents of the organization. City of Refuge is located at 1300 Joseph E. Boone Blvd.
Atlanta, GA 30314.

References

1997 establishments in Georgia (U.S. state)
Organizations based in Atlanta